Gillian Wright (born 5 May 1960) is an English actress, best known for portraying the role of Jean Slater on the BBC soap opera EastEnders since 2004, for which she has won a number of awards. She was a teacher and theatre director before occupying acting roles.

Career
Wright was originally signed for one episode on EastEnders in December 2004, but bosses brought her back into the series a year later for four more episodes. After guest starring in two episodes of rival soap opera Coronation Street, she then returned to EastEnders on a recurring basis until her character moved into Albert Square in November 2007. In 2006, she collected a Mental Health Media Award for her portrayal of Jean Slater, a person living with bipolar disorder.

Her departure from the series was announced in 2010, along with her on-screen daughter Stacey Slater, played by Lacey Turner, but it was later confirmed that she would return in spring 2011. In 2012, she won the 'Best Actress' award at the Inside Soap Awards. She departed EastEnders again in 2013 and returned for a short stint in August 2014. She also guest starred in one episode of hospital drama, Holby City in early 2015. After making numerous guest appearances from 2015 to 2017, the character of Jean was reintroduced in 2018 by former executive consultant John Yorke. She also won 'Best Dramatic Performance' at the 2019 British Soap Awards.

Theatre
Wright is also an established theatre actress, and is a visiting director and workshop leader at drama schools, universities and with young people with special needs. She is a co-founder of Pilot Theatre, at York's Theatre Royal.

In December 2011, she played the Fairy Godmother in the pantomime Dick Whittington and His Cat at the Aylesbury Waterside Theatre, starring alongside Jonathan Wilkes.

In September 2013, she appeared in the world premiere of five visceral new short plays, under the collective title Religion and Anarchy, at the Jermyn Street Theatre. From December 2013 to January 2014, she appeared as the Fairy Godmother in Cinderella at the Gordon Craig Theatre in Stevenage. She also performed at the Theatre Royal, Norwich during a production of Sleeping Beauty in 2017.

Filmography

Awards and nominations

References

External links

 

1960 births
Living people
English soap opera actresses
English television actresses
Alumni of Bretton Hall College